Akron Summit Assault was an American soccer team based in Akron, Ohio, United States. Founded in 2010, they played their only season in the USL Premier Development League (PDL), the fourth tier of the American Soccer Pyramid, in the Great Lakes Division of the Central Conference.

The team played the majority of its home games in the stadium at St. Vincent-St. Mary High School, with selected games being held at Lee Jackson Field on the campus of the University of Akron. The team's colors were orange, lime green, and white.

History
Akron Summit Assault was announced as a USL Premier Development League expansion franchise on February 23, 2011, as an unofficial replacement for the Cleveland Internationals franchise which folded at the end of 2010. They played their first competitive game on May 14, 2011, in a 2-0 loss to Chicago Fire Premier. The first goal in franchise history was scored by Michael O'Neill in their next game, a 2-2 tie with the Cincinnati Kings. On Sunday, July 24, 2011, the Akron played their final game, a 1-4 loss against the Chicago Fire U-23 finishing the season with a 5-8-3 record. The Akron Summit Assault folded after the 2011 season for undisclosed reasons. Although it is generally understood that the reason was financial distress.

Players

Final roster

Year-by-year

Head coaches
  Denzil Antonio (2011)

Stadium
 Stadium at St. Vincent-St. Mary High School; Akron, Ohio (2011)
 Lee Jackson Field at the University of Akron; Akron, Ohio (2011) 2 games

Average attendance
Attendance stats are calculated by averaging each team's self-reported home attendances from the historical match archive at https://web.archive.org/web/20100105175057/http://www.uslsoccer.com/history/index_E.html.

 2011: 185

References

External links
 Official site
 Official PDL site

Association football clubs established in 2010
USL League Two teams
Soccer clubs in Ohio
2010 establishments in Ohio
2011 disestablishments in Ohio
Sports in Akron, Ohio
Association football clubs disestablished in 2011